Leucocoprinus ianthinus is a species of mushroom producing fungus in the family Agaricaceae. Like other Leucocoprinus species it may have originated in a tropical climate but now finds a home in plant pots, greenhouses and compost piles in many countries. Despite a widespread distribution it is seldom recorded and appears to be rarer than other Leucocoprinus species. It is not seen in plant pots with the same kind of regularity as the well known Leucocoprinus birnbaumii.

Taxonomy 
It was first described in 1888 by the English botanist and mycologist Mordecai Cubitt Cooke who classified it as Leucocoprinus ianthinus based on specimens collected in the hothouses of Kew Gardens (London, England) in 1888. In 1891 the Italian mycologist Pier Andrea Saccardo reclassified this as Lepiota ianthinus or Lepiota janthina in the original text. It was reclassified as Leucocoprinus ianthinus in 1945 by Marcel Locquin.

An additional basionym was classified as Lepiota lilacinogranulosa or Lepiota lilacino-granulosa by the German mycologist Paul Christoph Hennings in 1898. In 1934 the French botanists and mycologists Roger Heim and Henri Romagnesi reclassified it as a variant of Hiatula cepaestipes (now known as Leucocoprinus cepistipes). The species was reclassified as Leucocoprinus lilacinogranulosa by Locquin in 1943 however this is now also recognised as a synonym of Leucocoprinus ianthinus.

Description 
Leucocoprinus ianthinus is a small dapperling mushroom with thin white flesh.

Cap: 1.5-7cm. Starts ovate/hemispherical before becoming campanulate (bell shaped) with a distinct umbo that displays brown or slightly lilac scales/down against the white cap. Pronounced grooves run to the edge of the cap, which is usually curled upwards. The curling of the edges may become especially noticeable as the mushrooms dry out. Stem: 3.5-7cm. Tapers upwards from a slightly swollen base as seen in other Leucocoprinus species. Presents with an annulus but may quickly disappear as the mushroom grows. Lilac fibres may be present at base. Gills: White, discolouring to slightly lilac. Spacing varies from distant to crowded, attachment to the stipe is free. Spore print: White-pale lilac. Spores: Ellipsoid to almond shaped, smooth with a narrow germ pore. Dextrinoid. 9.5-10.5 x 6.5-7 μm. Taste: astringent and strong. Smell: Mushroomy.

Similar species 

 Leucocoprinus brebissonii also occurs in plant pots and can appear quite similar. The cap scales may appear slightly more purple brown on L. ianthinus.
 Leucocoprinus heinemannii and some related, possibly yet unclassified, species appear similar but may have darker almost black scales.
 Leucocoprinus lilacinogranulosus is considered a synonym for L. ianthinus however some sources suggest they may be separate species and discuss the presence of it in plant pots in Poland.

References 

Leucocoprinus